Oosterleek is a village in the municipality of Drechterland, in the Dutch province North Holland. The village used to belong to the municipalities Venhuizen (1970–2006) and Wijdenes (pre-1970).

Oosterleek was first noted on a map in 1311 as Oesterleke, in which oester means "eastern" and leke means "stream". This name was supposedly a reference to the fact that the village was located to the east of a stream. During the 17th century, it was a fishing village which was home to a population of about 500 people.

Nowadays, a small bit of Oosterleek lays in the Markermeer, because the levee  was moved westwards to guarantee full safety. It is said that this part included a church. The current church was built in 1694. The church was decommissioned in 1972, and is nowadays used for weddings, expositions and concerts. It is also home to local library.

Gallery

References 

Populated places in North Holland
Drechterland